Dobrapomoc  is a village in the administrative district of Gmina Pogorzela, within Gostyń County, Greater Poland Voivodeship, in west-central Poland. In 1975-1998 Dobrapomoc was administratively in Szkaradowo.

The name Dobrapomoc translates into English as "good help".

References

Dobrapomoc